The Division of Honour is the second-level football league in Luxembourg.  It lies below the National Division and above the 1. Division.

Current clubs
The clubs competing in the 2021–22 season are listed below.

Previous winners

Promotion groups (1989–1994)

References

Federation Luxembourgeoise de Football
RTL coverage of the Eierepromotioun
Federation Luxembourgeoise de Football Results list

2
Second level football leagues in Europe